Agustín Sierra Romera (born September 23, 1990), also known as Cachete Sierra is an Argentine actor.

Biography 
Agustín Sierra Romera was born on September 23, 1990, in Buenos Aires, Argentina, to Roberto Sierra and María Romera. He has one older brother named, Roberto Sierra Romera and one older sister named, Paula Sierra Romera.

Personal life 
From 2008 to 2010, Agustín Sierra was in a relationship with his co–star the actress, Candela Vetrano.

From 2016 to 2017, Agustín Sierra was in a relationship with the model and actress, Camila Mateos.

Since 2021, Agustín Sierra is in a relationship with Fiorella Giménez, his dance partner in the program of Bailando 2021.

Career 
Agustín Sierra, debuted as an actor in 1999 at age 9 in Verano del '98. From 1999 to 2001, he was part of the cast of the youth television series Chiquititas. Between 1999 and 2001, he made the theatrical seasons of Chiquititas. In 2001, he was summoned by Cris Morena for the special Chiquititas de Oro where he and the most prominent of all seasons came together to receive the award Chiquititas de Oro. In 2001, he was part of the cast of the film Chiquititas: Rincón de luz.

In 2002, he made a special appearance in the youth television series Rebelde Way starring Camila Bordonaba, Felipe Colombo, Luisana Lopilato and Benjamín Rojas.

In 2003, he was part of the cast of the children's television series Rincón de Luz starring Guido Kaczka and Soledad Pastorutti. Between 2003 and 2004, he made the theatrical seasons of Rincón de Luz.

From 2004 to 2005, he was part of the cast of the youth television series Floricienta starring Florencia Bertotti, Juan Gil Navarro and Fabio Di Tomaso.

In 2006, he made a special appearance in the youth television Alma Pirata. In 2006, he made a special appearance in the children's television series Chiquititas Sin Fin.

From 2007 to 2010, he was part of the cast of the youth television series Casi Ángeles. Between 2007 and 2010, he made the theatrical seasons of Casi Ángeles.

In 2014, he was part of the cast of the television series Sandía con vino. In 2014, he made a special appearance in the youth television Aliados.

In 2015, he was part of the cast of the film Chicos Católicos. In 2015, he was part of the play El club del chamuyo.

From 2015 to 2016, he was part of the Chicos Católicos.

In 2017, he made a special appearance in the television Golpe al corazón.

From 2017 to 2018, he was part of the Desesperados.

In 2019, he was part of the play La madre que los parió. In 2019, he made a special appearance in the television series Pequeña Victoria. In 2019, he was part of the cast of the film Te pido un taxi.

From 2019 to 2021, he was part of the play Sex, viví tu experiencia.

In 2020, he made a special appearance in the television series Separadas.

Filmography

Television

Theater

Television programs

Movies

Discography

Soundtrack albums 
 1999 —  Chiquititas Vol. 5
 2000 — Chiquititas Vol. 6
 2001 — Chiquititas Vol. 7
 2001 — Chiquititas: Rincón de Luz
 2003 — Rincon de Luz
 2008 — Casi Ángeles
 2009 — Casi Ángeles
 2010 — Casi Ángeles

References

External links
 

Argentine male actors
People from Buenos Aires
1990 births
Living people